The 2016 AFC Futsal Club Championship was the 7th edition of the AFC Futsal Club Championship, the annual Asian futsal club championship organized by the Asian Football Confederation (AFC). The tournament was held in Bangkok, Thailand between July 17 and July 23, 2016.

Qualified teams

A total of 12 teams from 12 AFC member associations participated in the tournament.

Venue
The matches are played at the Bangkok Arena in Bangkok.

Draw
The draw was held on 6 May 2016 in Bangkok. The 12 teams were drawn into four groups of three teams. Besides the team from the host association Thailand, the teams from Iran, Vietnam and Iraq were also seeded as per the final ranking of the 2015 AFC Futsal Club Championship.

Squads

Each team had to submit a squad of 14 players, including a minimum of two goalkeepers.

Match officials
The following referees were chosen for the 2016 AFC Futsal Club Championship.
Referees

 Ryan Shepheard
 Scott Kidson
 An Ran
 Chan Ka Chung
 Mahmoud Reza Nasirlou
 Hasan Mohammed Mousa Al-Gburi
 Kobayashi Hiroyuki
 Kozaki Tomohiro 
 Husein Mahmoud Husein Khalaileh
 Nurdin Bukuev
 Mohamad Chami
 Helday Idang 
 Rey Ritaga 
 Yuttakon Maiket

Group stage
The top two teams of each group advanced to the quarter-finals.

Tiebreakers
The teams were ranked according to points (3 points for a win, 1 point for a draw, 0 points for a loss). If tied on points, tiebreakers would be applied in the following order:
Greater number of points obtained in the group matches between the teams concerned;
Goal difference resulting from the group matches between the teams concerned;
Greater number of goals scored in the group matches between the teams concerned;
If, after applying criteria 1 to 3, teams still have an equal ranking, criteria 1 to 3 are reapplied exclusively to the matches between the teams in question to determine their final rankings. If this procedure does not lead to a decision, criteria 5 to 9 apply;
Goal difference in all the group matches;
Greater number of goals scored in all the group matches;
Penalty shoot-out if only two teams are involved and they are both on the field of play;
Fewer score calculated according to the number of yellow and red cards received in the group matches (1 point for a single yellow card, 3 points for a red card as a consequence of two yellow cards, 3 points for a direct red card, 4 points for a yellow card followed by a direct red card);
Drawing of lots.

All times are local, ICT (UTC+7).

Group A

Group B

Group C

Group D

Knockout stage
In the knockout stage, extra time and penalty shoot-out were used to decide the winner if necessary (no extra time would be used in the third place match).

Bracket

Quarter-finals

Semi-finals

Third place play-off

Final

Awards

 Most Valuable Player
  Farhad Tavakoli ( Naft Al-Wasat)
 Top Scorer
  Jirawat Sornwichian (7 goals)
 Fair-Play Award
  Dibba Al-Hisn
 All-Star Team
  Yushi Sekiguchi (Nagoya Oceans) (GK)
  Farhad Tavakoli (Naft Al-Wasat)
  Tomoki Yoshikawa (Nagoya Oceans)
  Jirawat Sornwichian (Chonburi Bluewave)
  Ghodrat Bahadori (Naft Al-Wasat)
 Reserve All-Star Team
  Ahmed Duraid (Naft Al-Wasat) (GK)
  Karim Abou Zeid (Dibba Al-Hisn)
  Mustafa Bachay Hamzah (Naft Al-Wasat)
  Suphawut Thueanklang (Chonburi Bluewave)
  Hossein Tayebi (Tasisat Daryaei)
 Coach:  Pedro Costa (Nagoya Oceans)

Statistics

Goalscorers

Tournament team rankings

References

External links
AFC Futsal Club Championship, the-AFC.com

 
2016
Club
2016
2016 in Thai football
July 2016 sports events in Asia